Ojaq Qoli Kandi (also Romanized as Ojāq Qolī Kandī; also known as Ojāq Qolī) is a village in Arshaq-e Gharbi Rural District, Moradlu District, Meshgin Shahr County, Ardabil Province, Iran. At the 2006 census, its population was 23, in 5 families.

References 

Towns and villages in Meshgin Shahr County